Founded in 2014, the Parque Ibirapuera Conservação is a nonprofit organization that identifies, preserves and enhances the natural, historical and cultural assets of Ibirapuera Park—the most visited park in the South America—and engages local communities to care for others urban parks.

Recognized as one of the largest urban park community organization in Brazil, the Parque Ibirapuera Conservação has provided nearly $1.5 million in aid to support Ibirapuera Park including the Reading Grove restoration, irrigation systems, research and conservation actions, volunteer engagement, and interpretive programs. The organisation work is made possible through the support of its members and donors, contributions from foundations, businesses, and individuals.

The organization follows the steps and the earlier governance model of Central Park Conservancy, when it also engages the parks neighborhood into a local pioneering project to professionalize urban park stewardship through civil society, and to serve as model to other urban parks and public open spaces. As Parque Ibirapuera Conservação seeks international management models for caring of public spaces, it also functions as a local knowledge hub for urban parks in Brazil when providing assistance and guidance to parks friends groups.

In 2017, Ibirapuera Park entered into the municipal concession program, and the Parque Ibirapuera Conservação members are advocating for better governance and more transparency so that no matter what model the municipality chooses to adopt for its parks, the control should remain public.

References

External links 
 

Environmental organisations based in Brazil
Non-profit organisations based in Brazil
Nature conservation organizations based in South America
Nature conservation in Brazil
Public–private partnership projects